Jean Perrottet (31 May 1925 – 26 February 2021) was a French architect. He was best known for his restorations of Parisian theatres in the 1960s.

Biography
Perrottet studied architecture at the Beaux-Arts de Paris from 1947 to 1954 alongside Guy Lagneau. He was awarded the Prix de l'Équerre d'Argent in 1960.

Perrottet specialized in public architectural projects, particularly theatres and cultural centers. Thanks to André Malraux and Jack Lang, he was able to gain support from the French government, which helped him gain notoriety. He helped restore the old Théâtre Sarah-Bernhardt, which became the Théâtre de la Ville.

Jean Perrottet died on 26 February 2021, at his home in Montreuil, at the age of 95.

Main Works
Théâtre de la Ville (1968)
Théâtre national de Chaillot (1975)
Théâtre du Vésinet (1975)
 (1975)
 (1976)
Salle des congrès du Mans (1981)
 (1986)
Théâtre national de la Colline (1988)
 (1994)
Théâtre municipal d'Angoulême (1997)
Pôle culturel de La Seyne-sur-Mer (2006)

References

1925 births
2021 deaths
Architects from Paris